Sylvain Barrier (born 20 October 1988 in Oyonnax) is a French motorcycle racer. He has won the FIM Superstock 1000 Cup twice, winning the title in 2012, and again in 2013.

Career

He has raced in the FIM Superstock 1000 Cup since 2008, mostly in a BMW machinery finishing 6th in 2010 with two podiums, 4th in 2011 with a 1 win and 4 podiums, and champion in 2012 and 2013, he previously raced in the European Superstock 600 championship in 2006 and 2007. In his first season in the FIM Superstock 1000 Championship in 2008 he finished 16th, and in 2009 he finished 5th both years aboard a Yamaha. He made his Superbike World Championship debut in the Jerez circuit finishing 12th in Race 1, and 13th in Race 2, scoring 7 points during the weekend, however also turned the last race for the BMW factory team, as BMW Motorrad announced his withdrawal as an official team in July.

In 2018 he competed in the British Superbike Championship aboard a BMW S1000RR.

Career statistics

Superbike World Championship

Races by year
(key) (Races in bold indicate pole position; races in italics indicate fastest lap)

References

External links
 
 

1988 births
Living people
French motorcycle racers
FIM Superstock 1000 Cup riders
People from Oyonnax
Superbike World Championship riders
Sportspeople from Ain
British Superbike Championship riders